Neale Hamilton Tayler (June 16, 1917 – 1986) was the third president of Wilfrid Laurier University. He held the position from 1978 to 1982.

References

1917 births
1986 deaths
Canadian university and college chief executives
Academic staff of Wilfrid Laurier University